Albert Rudolf "Bep" Thomas (born 7 October 1938) is a retired Dutch football referee.

Refereeing career
Thomas began his refereeing career in Amsterdam before being assigned to officiate in the Eerste Divisie. In 1979, he was promoted to the Eredivisie, where he officiated 248 matches. In 1981, Thomas was appointed as a FIFA referee.

In 1988, Thomas was chosen as a referee for UEFA Euro 1988, where he officiated a group stage match between Spain and Denmark.

Thomas stopped officiating internationally and in the Eredivisie in 1989, before retiring from officiating in 1991.

References

External links
 
 
 

1938 births
Living people
Sportspeople from Amsterdam
Dutch football referees
UEFA Euro 1988 referees